The Woman in Gold (German: Die Frau in Gold, French: Les Voleurs de gloire) is a 1926 German-French silent film directed by Pierre Marodon and starring Lotte Neumann, Ernö Verebes and Suzanne Pierson.

The film's sets were directed by Fritz Kraenke.

Cast
 Lotte Neumann as Véra Barkany
 Ernö Verebes as Georges Lenoir
 Suzanne Pierson as Suzanne de Fronval
 Henri Baudin as Paul Berkany
 Eduard von Winterstein 
 Paul Graetz 
 Ferdinand Bonn 
 Sophie Pagay

References

Bibliography
 Alfred Krautz. International directory of cinematographers, set- and costume designers in film, Volume 4. Saur, 1984.

External links
 
 
 Die Frau in Gold at filmportal.de

1926 films
Films of the Weimar Republic
German silent feature films
Films directed by Pierre Marodon
German black-and-white films
French black-and-white films
French silent feature films
Terra Film films